Michał Zalewski (born 19 January 1981), also known by the user name lcamtuf, is a computer security expert and "white hat" hacker from Poland. He is a former Google Inc. employee (until 2018), and currently the VP of Security Engineering at Snap Inc.

He has been a prolific vulnerability researcher and a frequent Bugtraq poster since the mid-1990s, and has written a number of programs for Unix-like operating systems. In 2005, Zalewski wrote Silence on the Wire: A Field Guide to Passive Reconnaissance and Indirect Attacks, a computer security book published by No Starch Press and subsequently translated into a number of languages.  In 2011, Zalewski wrote The Tangled Web: A Guide to Securing Modern Web Applications, also published by No Starch Press.

For his continued research on browser security, he was named one of the 15 most influential people in security and among the 100 most influential people in IT.

Zalewski was one of the original creators of Argante, a virtual open source operating system. Among other projects, he also created p0f and American fuzzy lop.

Reported bugs

 
 
 
 
  This vulnerability made an appearance on The Matrix Reloaded.
 
 
 Firefox wyciwyg:// cache vulnerability

References

External links
Michał Zalewski's personal home page
Michał Zalewski's personal blog
Interview with Michał Zalewski at OnLamp 

1981 births
Living people
People associated with computer security
Google employees